Tanjuska and the 7 Devils is a 1993 documentary film by Finnish director Pirjo Honkasalo about a ten-year-old Belarusian girl who is believed to have been possessed by the devil. It is the second part of Honkasalo's "Trilogy of the Sacred and the Satanic", preceded by Mysterion (1991) and followed by Atman (1997). The film won several international awards, including the International Jury Award at the Bombay International Film Festival.

References

1993 films
1993 documentary films
Finnish documentary films
Films directed by Pirjo Honkasalo
Documentary films about Christianity